The following are lists of county governors of the various counties of Norway. The Norwegian counties are under the supervision of county governors, appointed by the Norwegian government. Historically, there were larger diocesan counties that supervised smaller subordinate counties as well. This distinction was abolished on 1 January 1919. On 1 January 2020, there was a major reorganization and reduction of counties in Norway.

Current counties
 List of County Governors of Agder
 List of County Governors of Innlandet
 List of County Governors of Møre og Romsdal
 List of County Governors of Nordland
 List of County Governors of Oslo og Viken
 List of County Governors of Rogaland
 List of County Governors of Troms og Finnmark
 List of County Governors of Trøndelag
 List of County Governors of Vestfold og Telemark
 List of County Governors of Vestland
 Governor of Svalbard

Historic counties
 List of County Governors of Akershus
 List of County Governors of Aust-Agder
 List of County Governors of Buskerud
 List of County Governors of Finnmark
 List of County Governors of Hedmark
 List of County Governors of Hordaland
 List of County Governors of Nord-Trøndelag
 List of County Governors of Oppland
 List of County Governors of Oslo
 List of County Governors of Sogn og Fjordane
 List of County Governors of Sør-Trøndelag
 List of County Governors of Telemark
 List of County Governors of Troms
 List of County Governors of Vest-Agder
 List of County Governors of Vestfold
 List of County Governors of Østfold
 List of Diocesan Governors of Bergen
 List of Diocesan Governors of Hamar
 List of Diocesan Governors of Kristiania
 List of Diocesan Governors of Kristiansand
 List of Diocesan Governors of Trondhjem
 List of Diocesan Governors of Tromsø